The following table compares some characteristics of some subtitle editing software.

See also
 Subtitle (captioning)
 Subtitle editor

References

Film production software
Subtitling
Software comparisons